Wainka is an extinct genus of South American mammal, belonging to the order Litopterna. It lived during the Middle Paleocene.

Description

This animal is only known for a few teeth. The upper molars were almost triangular in shape, elongated, and possessed a rather massive paracone and metacone, more developed than other contemporary South American ungulates such as Anisolambda ; the upper molars were devoid of mesostyle.

With some doubts, Wainka has also been attributed a lower molar with well-marked ridges.

Classification

Wainka tshotshe was first described in 1935 by George Gaylord Simpson, based on an upper and lower molar, the latter of dubious attribution, from the Middle Paleocene of Cerro Redondo, Argentina. This animal has been attributed to various families of South American ungulates, such as the Notonychopidae and Proterotheriidae. Regardless, Wainka was a basal form and it is very likely that it was an early litoptern. Its real affinities are still unclear. Other litopterns from approximately the same age are Notonychops and Requisia.

Bibliography

G. G. Simpson. 1935. Descriptions of the oldest known South American mammals, from the Rio Chico Formation. American Museum Novitates 793:1-25
G. G. Simpson. 1948. The beginning of the age of mammals in South America. Part I. Bulletin of the American Museum of Natural History 91:1-232
J. F. Bonaparte and J. Morales. 1997. Un primitivo Notonychopidae (Litopterna) del Paleoceno inferior de Punta Peligro, Chubut, Argentina. Estudios Geológicos 53(5-6):263-274
Buckley, M. (2015). "Ancient collagen reveals evolutionary history of the endemic South American 'ungulates'". Proceedings of the Royal Society B: Biological Sciences. 282 (1806): 20142671–20142671. doi:10.1098/rspb.2014.2671

Litopterns
Paleocene mammals of South America
Paleogene Argentina
Fossils of Argentina
Fossils of Brazil
Paleogene Brazil
Fossil taxa described in 1901
Taxa named by George Gaylord Simpson
Prehistoric placental genera